Kaito Kawabata (川端 魁人, Kawabata Kaitō, born 17 August 1998) is a Japanese athlete. He competed in the men's 4 × 400 metres relay event at the 2020 Summer Olympics, equalling the national record.

References

External links
 

1998 births
Living people
Japanese male sprinters
Athletes (track and field) at the 2020 Summer Olympics
Olympic athletes of Japan
People from Matsusaka, Mie
Sportspeople from Mie Prefecture
21st-century Japanese people